Brežec pri Podgorju is a small settlement with no permanent residents in the City Municipality of Koper in the Littoral region of Slovenia.

The name
The official name of the village means 'Brežec near Podgorje', in order to distinguish it from other villages with the same name. The locals, however, usually refer to it simply as Brežec. The traditional Italian name of the village is Bressez, but it was renamed Brese di Piedimonte during the Fascist Italianization campaign in the 1920s because the old denomination was considered too Slavic-sounding.

References

External links
Brežec pri Podgorju on Geopedia

Populated places in the City Municipality of Koper